Lucy Martin Donnelly (September 18, 1870 – August 3, 1948) was a teacher of English at Bryn Mawr College. She was head of the English department starting in 1914.

Sources
James, E. T, Wilson James, J. and Boyer, P. S. 1971, Notable American Women, 1607–1950: A Biographical Dictionary (Volume 2), p. 499 
Russell, B. and Griffin, N. 1992, The selected letters of Bertrand Russell, p. (vi) Lucy Donnelly (Bryn Mawr College Archives)

External links
 

1870 births
1948 deaths